= Guy Houghton Blanchet =

- Born: 1884; Quebec, Canada
- Died: 1966 (aged 81–82); Victoria, British Columbia, Canada
- Education: McGill University
- Known for: Exploratory surveys in the Keewatin and Mackenzie districts of the Northwest Territories (1921-1925), Dominion Land Surveyor
- Engineering career
- Discipline: Mining engineering, surveying
- Employer(s): Crow’s Nest, Topographical Survey of Canada

Guy Houghton Blanchet (1884–1966) was a Canadian mining engineer, surveyor, and explorer belonging to Canada.

== Early life and education ==
Blanchet belonged to a remote French ancestry. He was the ninth of 11 Quebec family children, considered ancestors of the new French family, Finny. He attended local schools and completed his Bachelor’s in Engineering in mining engineering from McGill University, Montreal. After graduation, he joined the Crow’s Nest to work among the coal deposits in British Columbia.

== Career ==
After serving for two years among the coal deposits of Crow’s Nest, he qualified as Dominion Land Surveyor, which entitled him to put D.L.S. after his name. In those times, it was equivalent to a doctorate.

In 1910, he joined the Topographical Survey of Canada and drew baselines in the northern reaches of the prairie provinces during the next few years. During this time, he gained a reputation as a hardworking mining engineer. In 1921, he started to do exploratory surveys in the Keewatin and Mackenzie districts of the Northwest Territories for the next four years. His work mainly centered on the Great Slave Lake, where he traveled either by canoe or foot. He covered over 300,000 square km from the Dubawnt River on the east to the Hay river on the north.

== Death ==
He lived with his wife Eileen and sister Helen in Victoria when he died of a heart attack in 1966.
